Ercta vittata is a moth in the family Crambidae. It was described by Johan Christian Fabricius in 1794. It is found in the West Indies (Puerto Rico, Hispaniola, Jamaica, Cuba) and South America (including Trinidad and Brazil). It has also been recorded from Costa Rica and southern Florida.

References

Moths described in 1794
Spilomelinae